Paduvar Muththappa Chettiyar  ( பாடுவார் முத்தப்பச் செட்டியார்) (1767–1829) was an Indian poetic scholar of the Minor Literary Canons in Tamil.

Works
  Nagara vaazththu (நகர வாழ்த்து)  a poetical work containing Historical information of Old Tamil and ethnographic descriptions of Nagaraththaar Community.
  Jeyangkondaar Cathagam (செயங்கொண்டார் சதகம்)  a poetic work containing 100 songs on Jeyangkondiiswarar enshrined in the Siva Temple of Nemam.  In this work he has included a proverb in each and every song. It is printed and published in 1893.
 Thirumuruga Vilaacam (திருமுக விலாசம்) 
 Kuthiriyadi (குதிரையடி) a Minor Canon
 Kuluva Naadagam (குளுவ நாடகம்) a drama
 Pazhaniyaandavar Pathigam (பழனியாண்டவர் பதிகம்)
 Kudrakkudi Murugan Pathigam (குன்றக்குடி முருகன் பதிகம்)

Further reading
 குன்றக்குடி பெரியபெருமாள், தமிழ் வளர்த்த நல்லறிஞர்கள், சென்னை: 1996

External links
 பாடுவார் முத்தப்பர் வரலாறு – டாக்டர் எஸ். ஜெயபாரதி
 பாடுவார் முத்தப்பச் செட்டியார் வரலாறு

Tamil-language literature
Tamil scholars
1767 births
1829 deaths